Owais Rehmani (born 30 September 1987) is a Pakistani cricketer. He made his first-class debut for Karachi Whites in the 2007–08 Quaid-e-Azam Trophy on 21 October 2007.

In 2015, he represented Pakistan Navy in the International Defence Cricket Challenge and was named the best batsman and player of the tournament against the Royal Malaysian Air Force.

References

External links
 

1987 births
Living people
Pakistani cricketers
Karachi Blues cricketers
Karachi Dolphins cricketers
Karachi Whites cricketers
Karachi Zebras cricketers
Cricketers from Karachi
Pakistan Navy personnel